The Silva Gallinaria is a rich thicket characterized by evergreen trees and shrubs typical of the Macchia Mediterranea, which grows naturally on a sandy and devoid of water. The most common tree that reigns unchallenged is Quercus ilex (Holm Oak). This kind of jungle resumed the general characteristics of the Mediterranean Evergreen Forest but is distinguished for being contextualized in the Campania territory, specifically inside the area around Cuma - Licola - Liternum, and the historical baggage that inherits the early settlers of this coast: the Greeks, who founded the city of Cuma, which today form an acropolis.

The Gallinaria Silva, after the dissolution of the National Opera for Comabattenti today is part of two natural reserve park: the Regional Flegrei Field on the coast of Licola - Cuma, and Natural Reserve of "Foce Volturno Costa di Licola", in the Campania Region.

For his interesting natural and historical heritage can be made educational tours organized by NPO in the territory.
Another company that manages the urban transport by bus is the CTP.

Vegetation 

Is typical of the Campi Flegrei, an extended time limits and without separating the beach from Cuma marshy rear part, until you reach the chain Massico and the Volturno River.
The words Silva Gallinaria was given time away from the coast colonizers. Basically this jungle takes over the distinctive characteristics of the Mediterranean evergreen forest. In this case, from underwater vegetation on the seabed persist meadows of Posidonia ocean, while on shore you notice a large presence of vegetation sand heaths, crucial for stabilizing the function that performs on dunali cords and the same.
On the coastal dunes in front is missing, the sparzio pungent, the euphorbia sea, the calcatreppola, fennel thorny grass and sand.
Particular attention are the plants that need forms of protection by man, such as halophytic nitrophilous like nappola thorny, the polygon sand, the sea ravastrello and many other crop that the roots lie in the sand by opposing the erosion and corrosion. Requires special protection of the Giglio Cuma (Pancratium maritimum).
Dunes inwards extends the jungle itself. A vast forest of oaks, with the presence of pines and Roverelli, suggestively around the coastline, of mixed shrubs and plants typical of the Mediterranean, such as mastic, strawberry tree, rosemary, myrtle, heather, rock, and many others.
Moreover, since the reclamation (1932 approximately) the entire area is cut by channels, where they found the place rows of reeds and rushes.

The Silva Gallinaria in the history 

Mentioned many times by authors like Cicero and Juvenal, in the past was used (according to Strabo) for the construction of vessels in the fleet of Sesto Pompeo during the Civil War, causing a massive thinning of trees mainly Leccio, good for the quality of the wood having them a variety of oak, while other areas of the forest were intended to pasture, particularly the producers of oak acorns.
The result caused by the depletion of tree belt, which was a providential defense windbreaks for crops behind, took effect as the burning of plantations, no longer sheltered from strong winds and Libeccio Maestrale coming from the sea, justifying the setting up of rows of poplars planted by man.
In different eras, the Gallinari Silva, was temutissima by merchants for the perils of robbers who were hiding. They used it as a nest for shelter that offered them had impenetrability of dense vegetation.

Animals 

The heritage of the Wild Animal hosts a great variety of animal species, especially marsh birds that find shelter and rest after the long migration. Among the mammals are grim foxes, hares, rabbits and wild marten. From a bird, among many are: Sylvia melanocephala, wren, blackbird, chaffinch, magpie, owl, robin, green, and barbagianni Miyamoto.
The forest also provides shelter all'upupa, the cuckoo, the woodcock, the thrush. Instead, the wetlands are: gallinella water, germani real coot, and sometimes even the heron cinerino. Among the woods and shoreline, you see the typical flying seabirds such as gulls real and common gull, the Starna common and Starna gambenere, along with many Waders, including gambecchio woodcock and sea.
Among the reptiles, are the biacco, the grass snake by the collar, the Lacerta bilineata and rare sightings have occurred even Lacerta viridis, while among amphibians dominates the green frog.
Also on the beach nest Caretta caretta sea turtle.

Protection's forms 

Today, the beach front Cuma la Selva, is protected by European legislation and is one of the sites of Community Importance (SCI) in the presence of that endemics and is considered a Special Protection Area (SPA) for the sensitive habitat of the dune.

Archaeological sites in Campania
Geography of Campania